Lincoln Prison may refer to:

 HM Prison Lincoln, a men's prison in Lincoln, Lincolnshire, England
 Port Lincoln Prison, a low security prison in Port Lincoln, South Australia